Herpetogramma hirsuta is a moth in the family Crambidae. It was described by Paul Dognin in 1903. It is found in Ecuador.

References

Moths described in 1903
Herpetogramma
Moths of South America